A symbol is something that represents an idea, a process, or a physical entity.

Symbol may also refer to:

Computing
 Symbol (computing), a data structure used by a language translator
 Symbol (data), the smallest amount of data transmitted at a time in digital communications
 Symbol (programming), a primitive data type in many programming languages used to name variables and functions
 Symbol (typeface), a font designed by Aldo Novarese (1982), one of the four standard PostScript fonts
 Debug symbol, debugging information used to troubleshoot computer programs, analyze memory dumps
 Unicode character, symbols which can be represented and displayed with standard code numbers

Film and television
 Symbol (film), a movie by Hitoshi Matsumoto
 Symbol (TV series), a TV series that aired on Disney Channel from 1984 to 1991

Logic
 Symbol (formal), a string, used in formal languages and formal systems
 Symbol grounding, the problem of how symbols acquire meaning

Music
 Symbol (album), a 2005 album by Japanese electronica musician Susumu Yokota
 Symbol (Prince album), unofficial name for his 1992 album
 Symbols (album), a 1997 album from the industrial rock band KMFDM
 Symbol (choir), a choir in Romania
 The Symbol (album), a 2007 album by Japanese girl group Shanadoo
 The Symbols, an English pop music band
 Symbol Records, a record label, part of Sue Records

Theology
 Symbol (liturgical theology), in contrast to a sign, and relevant to liturgy
 Creed, a statement of shared beliefs of a religious community
 Nicene Creed or Symbolum Nicaenum, the profession of faith or creed that is most widely used in Christian liturgy

Other uses
 Symbol (chemistry), an abbreviation that identifies a chemical element
 Symbol (semiotics), a sign that signifies through arbitrary social convention
 Symbol (mathematics)
 Symbol (metric system), a representation of a metric unit independent of language
 Symbol (number theory), various generalizations of the Legendre symbol
 Symbol, Kentucky, an unincorporated community in Laurel County, Kentucky, United States
 Ticker symbol, an abbreviation used to uniquely identify publicly traded shares of a particular stock
 Symbol Technologies, an AIDC company based in Holtsville, New York, United States
 Casablanca Conference codenamed SYMBOL, the conference to plan the Allied European strategy for the next phase of World War II

See also
 Simbolul, a Romanian literary magazine
 Symbolic (disambiguation)
 Symbolism (disambiguation)
 Cymbal, round metal plates used as  percussion instruments
 List of symbols